Gladius is a tactical role-playing video game developed and published by LucasArts. It was released in 2003 for the GameCube, PlayStation 2 and Xbox.

Overview
The game allows the player to build a school of gladiators and take them into battle against opposing schools in a quest for fame and glory. The plot focuses on several of the main characters and slowly affects the decisions of the group, eventually leading to a final large battle that tests the skills of all members of the school.  Upon starting the game, the player can choose between a school in Imperia, home to a strong military mentality and soldiers who consider their northern neighbors uncivilized and bullish, or a school in Nordagh, where witches and woodland beasts dwell, and who in turn detest the Imperials for their desire for greater conquest.

The gladiators have the opportunity to travel through four distinctly different regions on their road to the ultimate championship.  Depending on the player's school choice, they begin in either the Northern lands of Nordagh (Barbarian school), which has a culture similar to that of 'Nordic' lands, or Imperia (Gladiator school), an Imperial Roman land. Upon completion of these two stages of play one proceeds onto the Windward Steppes, a grasslands region dominated by archers and beasts, reminiscent of the steppes of Asia, followed by the Southern Expanse, a desert region filled with spellcasters, nomadic warriors, and insects. The latter is an area reminiscent of Ancient Egypt; the main insects of this region are beetles, which held a high importance in Egyptian mythology, and scorpions, a staple arachnid in any desert region. The conclusion of the game takes place in and around the large central arena of Caltha in the Imperial Region.

As in many role-playing video games, players outfit their characters with gear to increase their abilities, and as they win fights, they gain experience which allows them to don new equipment and undertake new quests.  Additionally, winning certain hidden or difficult contests allows the players to recruit unique character classes such as yetis, minotaurs, and the undead.

Fighting in Gladius uses a turn-based mechanism, but with a twist. There are "swing meters" - like those found in many golf games - that determine the accuracy and effectiveness of strikes.  The meters can be disabled in the options menu.

Multiplayer
Two game modes are offered here: co-op which allows up to four players to play in the story mode and complete the game side by side. The first player controls the movement throughout the world map and also the menu screens. Once player one engages in battle, the other players can enter and control the gladiators of their choice from the school. The other mode offered is the Versus mode. Here, up to four players can compete in an exhibition battle. The PlayStation 2 version of the game only supports up to 2 players at once.

Reception

The game received "generally favorable reviews" on all platforms according to the review aggregation website Metacritic. It was rated as one of the "best Xbox games most people never played" by Official Xbox Magazine.

References

External links

2003 video games
Cooperative video games
LucasArts games
GameCube games
PlayStation 2 games
School-themed video games
Tactical role-playing video games
Video games developed in the United States
Video games featuring female protagonists
Xbox games
Video games about gladiatorial combat
Video games scored by Mark Griskey
Video games set in the Roman Empire